The Electric Car Corporation plc was an electric car manufacturer and dealer based in Mayfair, London with an assembly plant in Flitwick, Bedfordshire. It made and sold the Citroën C1 ev'ie, an electric car adapted from the Citroën C1. The car was first released on 30 April 2009 with a list price of £16,850 ($24,989 US).

The company was dissolved in 2012.

Board of directors
Its board of directors comprised:
David Martell (secretary and 98% shareholder), the founder of Trafficmaster.
Robert Williams (2% shareholder), a former Trafficmaster director.

References

External links
Electric Car Corporation website

Car manufacturers of the United Kingdom
Electric vehicle manufacturers of the United Kingdom
Motor vehicle manufacturers based in London
Flitwick
Citroën